This timeline of the history of piracy in the 1630s is a chronological list of key events involving pirates between 1630 and 1639.

Events

1631

 June 20 - Murat Reis the Younger executes the Sack of Baltimore where he captured 108 English planters and local Irish people. Almost all the villagers were put in irons and taken to a life of slavery in North Africa.
 December - Frances Knight is captured by Algerian corsairs and forced into slavery.
 Unknown - The Franco-Moroccan Treaty is signed between Louis XIII and Abu Marwan Abd al-Malik II, with contributions by Murat Reis the Younger.

1633 

 August 12 - Cornelis Jol attacks Campeche, then owned by Spain.
 October 22 - Zheng Zhilong defeats a fleet of Dutch East India Company vessels in the Battle of Liaoluo Bay.
 Unknown - Samuel Axe, Abraham Blauvelt, and Sussex Cammock leave New Providence and sail for Honduras.

1635 

 Unknown - Murat Reis the Younger is captured near the Tunisian coast by the Knights of Malta then subsequently imprisoned and tortured.

1636 

 February 29 - Jacob Collaert and Mathieu Romboutsen were captured by Johan Evertsen after a five-hour battle.
 Unknown - The Spanish attack New Providence, prompting Samuel Axe to return and defend it.

1639 

 Summer - Nathaniel Butler captures a Spanish frigate near the harbor of Trujillo and is later paid 16,000 pesos in ransom.
 Unknown - William Jackson enters service under the Providence Island Company.

Births

1630 

 February 27 - Roche Braziliano
 Unknown - Stenka Razin

1631 

 Unknown - Isaac Rochussen

1632 

 Unknown - Thomas Paine

1635 

 Unknown - Nicholas van Hoorn
 Unknown - Henry Morgan

1637 

 Unknown - Gustav Skytte

Deaths

1637 

 August - Jacob Collaert

References 

Piracy by year
Piracy